Datuk (or Datuak) is a traditional, honorary title bestowed on a person by the agreement of a people or tribe in the Minangkabau language, spoken by the Minangkabau people of Indonesia and Malaysia. The title of Datuk was agreed upon by local, traditional leaders (Kerapatan Adat Nagari, abbreviated "KAN"). The title engenders great respect, and is only used for Minangkabau men who have become stakeholders of traditional leaders or penghulu (noblemen) for a particular tribe. When the title is bestowed, it is celebrated with a traditional ceremony (Malewa Gala) and a banquet.

Inheritance
Unlike other Malay traditions, the title of datuk is inherited according to the matrilineal system. When a datuk dies his title may pass to his brother or nephew, whoever is closest in the maternal line. If there is no maternal relative, it may be given to another tribal member with the agreement of the tribe.

If the tribe has expanded and split up into groups in other areas, it may appoint a new datuk by appending one or two words to the previous datuk title; for example, if a datuk name is Datuak Bandaro it may be expanded to Bandaro Putiah or Datuak Bandaro nan Putiah with the agreement of each tribal subgroup.

Tradition

The social status of a people in Minangkabau society may be seen from its datuk title. The beginning of the oldest titles usually consists of one syllable and is derived from Sanskrit (for example, Datuk Ketemanggungan). Other datuk titles are composed of two (or more) words (for example, Datuk Parpatiah nan Sabatang). After the Islamic influence, the title of datuk is derived from Arabic. Below is a list of major datuk titles in Minangkabau legend and tradition:

 Datuk Ketumanggungan
 Datuk Parpatiah nan Sabatang
 Datuk Bandaro
 Datuk Makhudum
 Datuk Indomo
 Datuk Sinaro

See also

 Indian honorifics, Indonesian and Malay titles originated from these
 Greater India
 Indosphere
 Barangay
 Datu
 Maginoo
 Ratu
 Principalía
 Malay styles and titles
 Hinduism in the Philippines
 History of the Philippines (Before 1521)

References

Malay culture
Minangkabau
Titles